Cyril Clifford Addison, FRS (28 November 1913 – 1 April 1994) was a British inorganic chemist.

Career
Addison was a member of the Chemical Inspection Department, Ministry of Supply from 1939 to 1945. He was Lecturer, Reader and Professor of Inorganic Chemistry, University of Nottingham from 1946 to 1978, and Leverhulme Emeritus Professor from 1978 to 1994.

Awards and honours
Addison was elected Fellow of the Royal Society on 19 March 1970 and President of the Royal Society of Chemistry from 1976 to 1977

Personal life
Addison married Marjorie Thompson in 1939; they had one son, one daughter.

Works
Inorganic chemistry of the main-group elements, Editor Cyril Clifford Addison, Chemical Society, 1978, 
HDA Corrosion Chemistry, Cyril Clifford Addison, Norman Logan, Defense Technical Information Center, 1977

References

1913 births
1994 deaths
People from Eden District
English chemists
Academics of the University of Nottingham
Fellows of the Royal Society
Alumni of Hatfield College, Durham